DPMI may refer to:
 DOS Protected Mode Interface
 Cashmeran (6,7-dihydro-1,1,2,3,3-pentamethyl-4(5H)-indanone), a synthetic musk